Ferenc Németh (born 4 April 1936) is a Hungarian modern pentathlete and Olympic champion. He won an individual gold medal at the 1960 Summer Olympics in Rome, and also won the team competition with the Hungarian team.

References

External links

1936 births
Living people
Hungarian male modern pentathletes
Olympic modern pentathletes of Hungary
Modern pentathletes at the 1960 Summer Olympics
Olympic gold medalists for Hungary
Olympic medalists in modern pentathlon
People from Halásztelek
Medalists at the 1960 Summer Olympics
Sportspeople from Pest County
20th-century Hungarian people
21st-century Hungarian people